A9X may refer to: 

 Apple A9X, a microprocessor architecture
 Holden LX Torana A9X, an Australian touring car
 A variant of the AIM-9 Sidewinder, an air-to-air missile